The Battle of Detern on 27 September 1426 marked the prelude to the  East Frisian rebellion against the rule of the tom Brok family over East Frisia.

In the course of the battle an East Frisian peasant army under Focko Ukena and Sibet of Rüstringen defeated the Oldenburg troops called by Chieftain Ocko II tom Brok to assist him, the Archbishop of Bremen and the counts of Hoya, Diepholz and Tecklenburg, who had besieged Detern. Focko Ukena - a former henchman of Ocko - thrashed the combined Bremen-Oldenburg cavalry force, after Count Dietrich of Oldenburg deserted his allies during the battle. Count Johann von Rietberg, the second son of Otto II of Rietberg and Conrad X of Diepholz fell in battle. and Archbishop Nicholas of Oldenburg-Delmenhorst was captured, but released after negotiations with the Bremen town council.

References 

Detern
Detern
History of Bremen (state)
1426 in Europe
Detern
Detern
Detern